Joelie Kaernerk is a Canadian Inuk politician from Hall Beach, Nunavut. He was elected to the Legislative Assembly of Nunavut in the 2017 general election. He represents the electoral district of Amittuq.

References

Members of the Legislative Assembly of Nunavut
Inuit politicians
Living people
Year of birth missing (living people)
21st-century Canadian politicians
Inuit from the Northwest Territories
Inuit from Nunavut
People from Hall Beach